Paul van der Sterren (born 17 March 1956 in Venlo, Netherlands) is a Dutch chess grandmaster. He won the Dutch Chess Championship twice, in 1985 and 1993. In 1993 he qualified for the Candidates Tournament for the FIDE World Chess Championship 1996, but was eliminated in the first round (+1 −3 =3) by Gata Kamsky. 

Van der Sterren represented the Netherlands in 11 consecutive Chess Olympiads from 1982 through 2000.

He is the author of the two-volume opening encyclopedia Fundamental Chess Openings, which was published in 2009 and 2011. He is also the author of the book Your first chess lessons published in 2016.

External links

References

1956 births
Living people
Chess grandmasters
Chess Olympiad competitors
Dutch chess players
Dutch chess writers
Sportspeople from Venlo
20th-century Dutch people